The 1996 Sparkassen Cup singles was the tennis singles event of the seventh edition of the Sparkassen Cup; a WTA Tier II tournament held in Leipzig, Germany.

Anke Huber successfully defended her title, defeating Iva Majoli in the final, 5–7, 6–3, 6–1.

Seeds
The top four seeds received a bye to the second round.

Draw

Finals

Top half

Bottom half

External links
 1996 Sparkassen Cup draw

Sparkassen Cup (tennis)
1996 WTA Tour